Eva Schreiber (born 12 March 1958) is a German politician. Born in Köln, North Rhine-Westphalia, she represents The Left. Eva Schreiber served as a member of the Bundestag from the state of Bavaria from 2017 to 2021.

Life 
Eva Schreiber passed the Abitur examination in 1977 and studied ethnology, intercultural communication and religious studies, graduating with a master's degree. In addition, she is a trained masseuse and medical lifeguard. She worked as a freelance lecturer in the field of adult education and has lived in Munich since 1990. She became member of the bundestag after the 2017 German federal election. She is a member of the Committee on the Environment, Nature Conservation and Nuclear Safety and the Committee on Economic Cooperation and Development.

References

External links 

  
 Bundestag biography 

1958 births
Living people
Members of the Bundestag for Bavaria
Female members of the Bundestag
21st-century German women politicians
Members of the Bundestag 2017–2021
Members of the Bundestag for The Left
Politicians from Cologne